Rob Boyd (born 15 February 1966) is a Canadian former alpine skier who competed in the 1988 Winter Olympics coached at the World Cup level, the Whistler Mountain Ski Club and is currently working as a Real Estate Advisor with Engel & Völkers Whistler.  In 1989 he was the first Canadian alpine skier to win a downhill on home soil.  He moved to Whistler in 1982 at age 16 and said "it opened up his eyes" after making the provincial ski team. He credits his sister for inspiring him to ski race and get good.

External links
 
 sports-reference.com
 https://www.robboydrealestate.ca

1966 births
Living people
Canadian male alpine skiers
Olympic alpine skiers of Canada
Alpine skiers at the 1988 Winter Olympics
Sportspeople from British Columbia